Xubida infusellus is a moth in the family Crambidae. It was described by Francis Walker in 1863. It is found in Guatemala, Brazil, Colombia, Suriname and Argentina.

References

Haimbachiini
Moths described in 1863